Pajipar  is one of the least populated villages of Nalbari district in Western Assam under 2 No Khata Gram Panchayat of Pub Nalbari Development Block.

Language 
The primary language used in Pajipar is Kamrupi, as in Nalbari district and Kamrup region

See also
 Villages of Nalbari District

References

External links
 

Villages in Nalbari district